Stanisław Kuryłłowicz (6 June 1909 – 2 February 1945) was a Polish rower. He competed at the 1936 Summer Olympics in Berlin with the men's coxed four where they were eliminated in the semi-final.

Kuryłłowicz enlisted to the Polish Army to fight the German invasion of Poland in 1939. He died on 2 February 1945 during the fights for the Poznań Citadel.

References

1909 births
1945 deaths
Polish male rowers
Olympic rowers of Poland
Rowers at the 1936 Summer Olympics
Sportspeople from Grodno
Polish military personnel of World War II
Polish military personnel killed in World War II
European Rowing Championships medalists
20th-century Polish people